The roles of German women have changed throughout history, as the culture and society in which they lived had undergone various transformations. Historically, as well as presently, the situation of women differed between German regions, notably during the 20th century, when there was a different political and socioeconomic organization in West Germany compared to East Germany. In addition, Southern Germany has a history of strong Roman Catholic influence.

Historical context
The traditional role of women in German society was often described by the so-called "four Ks" in the German language: Kinder (children), Kirche (church), Küche (kitchen), and Kleider (clothes), indicating that their main duties were bearing and rearing children, attending to religious activities, cooking and serving food, and dealing with clothes and fashion. However, their roles changed during the 20th century. After obtaining the right to vote in 1918, German women began to take on active roles previously performed by men. After the end of World War I, they were labeled as the Trümmerfrauen or "women of the rubble" because they took care of the "wounded, buried the dead, salvaged belongings", and participated in the "hard task of rebuilding war-torn Germany by simply clearing away" the rubble and ruins of war.

Although conservative in many ways, Germany nevertheless differs from other German-speaking regions in Europe, being much more progressive on women's right to be politically involved, compared to neighbouring Switzerland (where women obtained the right to vote in 1971 at federal level, and at local canton level in 1990 in the canton of Appenzell Innerrhoden) and Liechtenstein in 1984. In Germany, there are also strong regional differences; for instance Southern Germany (particularly Bavaria) is more conservative than other parts of Germany; while former East Germany is more supporting of women's professional life than former West Germany.

Marriage and family law

Family law in West Germany, had, until recently, assigned women a subordinate role in relation to their husbands. It was only in 1977 that legislative changes provided for gender equality in marriage; until that date, married women in West Germany could not work without permission from their husbands.
In East Germany, however, women had more rights.

In 1977, the divorce law in West Germany underwent major changes, moving from a fault based divorce system to one that is primarily no fault. These new divorce regulations, which remain in force today throughout Germany, stipulate that a no-fault divorce can be obtained on the grounds of one year of de facto separation if both spouses consent, and three years of de facto separation if only one spouse consents. There is also provision for a "speedy divorce" which can be obtained on demand by either spouse, without the necessary separation period, if it is proved in court that the continuation of the marriage would constitute an unreasonable hardship for the petitioner for reasons related to the behavior of the other spouse; this exemption requires exceptional circumstances and is considered on a case-by-case basis.

In recent years, in Germany, as in other Western countries, there has been a rapid increase in unmarried cohabitation and births outside of marriage. As of 2014, 35% of births in Germany were to unmarried women.
There are, however, marked differences between the regions of the former West Germany and East Germany: significantly more children are born out of wedlock in eastern Germany than in western Germany: in 2012, in eastern Germany 61.6% of births were to unmarried women, but in western Germany only 28.4%.

The views on sexual self-determination, as it relates to marriage, have also changed: for instance, until 1969, adultery was a criminal offense in West Germany. It was only in 1997, however, that Germany removed its marital exemption from its rape law, being one of the last Western countries to do so, after a lengthy political battle that started in the 1970s. Specifically, before 1997, the definition of rape in Germany was: "Whoever compels a woman to have extramarital intercourse with him, or with a third person, by force or the threat of present danger to life or limb, shall be punished by not less than two years’ imprisonment". In 1997 there were changes to the rape law, broadening the definition, making it gender-neutral, and removing the marital exemption. Before, marital rape could only be prosecuted as "Causing bodily harm" (Section 223 of the German Criminal Code), "Insult" (Section 185 of the German Criminal Code) and "Using threats or force to cause a person to do, suffer or omit an act" (Nötigung, Section 240 of the German Criminal Code) which carried lower sentences, and were rarely prosecuted.

Professional life

While women in East Germany were encouraged to participate in the workforce, this was not the case in West Germany, where a woman's primary role was understood to be at home, taking care of her family. In recent years, more women are working for pay. Although most women are employed, many work part-time; in the European Union, only the Netherlands and Austria have more women working part-time.
One problem that women have to face is that mothers who have young children and want to pursue a career may face social criticism. In 2014, the governing coalition agreed to impose a 30% female quota for Supervisory board positions from 2016 onwards.

Compared to other Western and even non-Western countries, Germany has a low proportion of women in business leadership roles, lower even than Turkey, Malaysia, Nigeria, Indonesia, Botswana, India. One of the reasons for the low presence of women in key positions is the social norm that considers full-time work inappropriate for women. Especially Southern Germany is conservative regarding gender roles. In 2011, José Manuel Barroso, then president of the European Commission, stated "Germany, but also Austria and the Netherlands, should look at the example of the northern countries [...] that means removing obstacles for women, older workers, foreigners and low-skilled job-seekers to get into the workforce".

Violence against women
A 2013 UN study of 202 world jurisdictions found that in Germany 47.3% of homicide victims are female, the 10th highest percentage of female victims of all jurisdictions, and considerably above the world average of 21.3% . The percentage of female victims was also high in neighboring Switzerland (50%) and Austria (40.2 %) (see Homicide statistics by gender).

Reproductive health and fertility
The maternal mortality rate in Germany is 7 deaths/100,000 live births (as of 2010). The HIV/AIDS rate is 0.1% of adults (aged 15–49) – estimates of 2009.
The total fertility rate (TFR) in Germany is 1.44 births per woman (2016 estimates), one of the lowest in the world. Childlessness is quite high: of women born in 1968 in West Germany, 25% stayed childless.

Abortion in Germany is legal during the first trimester on condition of mandatory counseling, and later in pregnancy in cases of medical necessity. In both cases there is a waiting period of 3 days.

Sex education in schools is mandated by law. The German Constitutional Court, and in 2011 the European Court of Human Rights, rejected complaints from several Baptist parents against Germany's mandatory school sex education.

See also 

 Alice Schwarzer
 Angela Merkel
 Feminism in Germany
 Gender roles in post-communist Central and Eastern Europe
 List of German queens
 List of German women artists
 List of German women photographers
 List of German women writers
 List of German women's football champions
 List of Germany women's international footballers
 Open Christmas Letter (To the Women of Germany and Austria)
 Women in German
 Women in German history series
 Women in German Studies
 Women in Nazi Germany

References

Further reading 
 Bernstein, George, and Lottelore Bernstein. "Attitudes toward Women's Education in Germany, 1870-1914." International Journal of Women's Studies 2 (1979): 473–488.
 Chickering, Roger.  “‘Casting their gaze more broadly’: Women's Patriotic Activism in Imperial Germany,” Past and Present 118 (1988), 156–85.
 Dawson, Ruth P. The Contested Quill: Literature by Women in Germany, 1770-1800 (U of Delaware Press, 2002).
 Green, Lowell. "The education of women in the Reformation." History of Education Quarterly 19.1 (1979): 93–116. online
 Gupta, Charu. "Politics of gender: women in nazi Germany." Economic and Political Weekly (1991): WS40-WS48 online.
 Harvey, Elizabeth. "Visions of the volk: German women and the far right from Kaiserreich to Third Reich." Journal of women's History 16.3 (2004): 152-167 online.
 Lewis, Gertrud Jaron. By Women, for Women, about Women: The Sister-Books of Fourteenth-Century Germany (PIMS, 1996).
 Lewis, Margaret Brannan. Infanticide and abortion in early modern Germany (Routledge, 2016).
 Mason, Tim. "Women in Germany, 1925-1940: Family, Welfare and Work. Part I." History Workshop 1976 online.
 Moeller, Robert G. Protecting motherhood: Women and the family in the politics of postwar West Germany (U of California Press, 1996).
 Petschauer, Peter. "Improving Educational-Opportunities for Girls in 18th-Century Germany." Eighteenth-Century Life 3.2 (1976): 56–62.
 Reagin, Nancy. A German Women’s Movement: Class and Gender in Hanover, 1880–1933 (U of North Carolina Press, 1995).
 Reagin, Nancy.  “The Imagined Hausfrau: National Identity, Domesticity and Colonialism in Imperial Germany,” Journal of Modern History 73#1 (2001): 54–86.
 Rublack, Ulinka. The crimes of women in early modern Germany (Oxford University Press, 1999).
 Simonton, Deborah, ed. The Routledge history of women in Europe since 1700 (Routledge, 2006).
 Steffens, Melanie C., and Christof Wagner. "Attitudes toward lesbians, gay men, bisexual women, and bisexual men in Germany." Journal of Sex Research 41.2 (2004): 137-149 online.
 Stephenson, Jill. Women in Nazi Germany (Pearson Education, 2001).
 Stibbe, Matthew.  Women in the Third Reich (Arnold, 2003),
 Wildenthal, Lora. German Women for Empire, 1884–1945 (Duke University Press, 2001)
 Wunder, Heide, and Thomas J. Dunlap, eds. He is the sun, she is the moon: women in early modern Germany (Harvard University Press, 1998).

External links 

 
Germany